Morgan D. Bazilian is an American-Irish academic, who has spent the majority of his career as a diplomat and in public service. He is the Director of the Payne Institute for Public Policy, and a professor of public policy at the Colorado School of Mines. His research focuses on energy and climate change policy, national security, and international affairs. In 2019, he was asked to testify in front of the U.S. Senate Committee on Energy and Natural Resources as an expert witness.

Education 
Bazilian has a bachelor's degree from the University of Michigan (1991), a master's in Building Energy Analysis from the University of Colorado (1999), a master's in Applied Physics from Murdoch University (2001), and a Ph.D. in Energy Systems and Thermodynamics from University of New South Wales (2002).

Career 

In 2001, Bazilian was a Fulbright Fellow at SINTEF in Norway. From 2002 to 2007, Bazilian served as the Head of Energy Policy and Climate Change at the Sustainable Energy Authority of Ireland. Following this, he became a political appointee and Senior Advisor on Energy and Climate to the Irish Ministry of Energy under Eamon Ryan. In 2008, Bazilian was the lead negotiator for the European Union on technology at the UNFCCC climate negotiations.  In 2009, he became Special Advisor on International Energy Issues to the Director-general of UNIDO, and helped to develop the United Nations Sustainable Energy For All Initiative while leading the UN-Energy program. In 2011, he began serving as the Deputy Director of the Joint Institute on Strategic Energy Analysis at the U.S. National Renewable Energy Laboratory. From 2014 to 2018, he was the World Bank's Lead Energy Specialist.

He is currently a Professor of Public Policy at the Colorado School of Mines, and is the inaugural Director of the Payne Institute for Public Policy. He is a member of the Council on Foreign Relations, the World Economic Forum’s Global Advisory Council on Energy, and the Global Advisory Council of the Sustainable Finance Programme at Oxford University. He holds or has held academic affiliations at IIASA, University of Cambridge, and Columbia University. In 2021, he was appointed to Ireland's Climate Change Advisory Council.

Prior to his career in energy and environmental policy, Bazilian was a professional mountain guide on Mount Rainier and Denali for both Rainier Mountaineering and International Mountain Guides. He is a published poet and short story writer who was named "Poet of the low-carbon transition" by Michael Liebreich.

Bibliography

Books edited
(co-editor with Fabien A Roques) Analytical Methods for Energy Diversity and Security: Portfolio Optimization in the Energy Sector: A Tribute to the work of Dr. Shimon Awerbuch (Elsevier Global Energy Policy and Economics Series). (Elsevier Science, 2008). ISBN 9780080915319

Academic Publications 
 Nussbaumer, P., Bazilian, M. & Modi, V. Measuring energy poverty: Focusing on what matters. Renewable Sustainable Energy Rev. (2012).
 Bazilian, M., Nussbaumer, P. & Rogner, H. H. Energy access scenarios to 2030 for the power sector in sub-Saharan Africa. Utilities Policy (2012).
 Bazilian, M., Rogner, H., Howells, M., Hermann, S. & Arent, D. Considering the energy, water and food nexus: Towards an integrated modelling approach. Energy Policy (2011).
 Bazilian, M., Onyeji, I., Liebreich, M., MacGill, I. & Chase, J. Re-considering the economics of photovoltaic power. Renewable Energy (2013).
 Bazilian, M., Nakhooda, S. & Van de Graaf, T. Energy governance and poverty. Energy Research & Social (2014).
 Heath, G. A., O’Donoughue, P., Arent, D. J. & Bazilian, M. Harmonization of initial estimates of shale gas life cycle greenhouse gas emissions for electric power generation. Proc. Natl. Acad. Sci. U. S. A. 111, E3167–76 (2014).
 Bazilian, M., Bradshaw, M., Goldthau, A. & Westphal, K. Model and manage the changing geopolitics of energy. Nature 569, 29–31 (2019).
 Sovacool, B. K., Ali, S., Bazilian, et al. Sustainable minerals and metals for a low-carbon future. Science 367, 30–33 (2020).

Commentaries 

 Bazilian, M. D. Power to the Poor. Foreign Affairs (2019).
 Jaffe, A. M., Iversen, L. & Bazilian, M. D. How Mini-Grids Can Power Disaster Recovery. Foreign Affairs (2017).
 Morgan D. Bazilian, P. M. New Oil Finds Could Mean a Tripling of Guyana's GDP. Foreign Policy (2019).
 Bazilian, M. D. We Need to Get Serious about ‘Critical Materials’. Scientific American (2019).
 Puliti, R. & Bazilian, M. D. How a Key Energy Technology Can Help Developing Countries. Scientific American (2019).

References 

Year of birth missing (living people)
Living people
Colorado School of Mines faculty
University of Michigan alumni
University of Colorado alumni
University of New South Wales alumni